Petra Novotná  (born ) is a retired Czech female volleyball player, who played as a universal. She was part of the Czech Republic women's national volleyball team.

She participated at the 2002 FIVB Volleyball Women's World Championship in Germany. On club level she played with PVK Olymp Prag.

Clubs
 PVK Olymp Prag (2002)

References

External links
http://www.bvbinfo.com/player.asp?ID=6710

1981 births
Living people
Czech women's volleyball players
Place of birth missing (living people)